O'Donel House and Farm is a historic home and farm complex located at Toboyne Township near Blain in Perry County, Pennsylvania. The complex consists of the farm house, bank barn, wood shed, outhouse, and combination washhouse / smokehouse.  The two bay house, erected about 1863, is built in the log corner post style (pièce-sur-pièce) and rests on a foundation of coursed fieldstone.

It was listed on the National Register of Historic Places in 1986.

References 

Houses on the National Register of Historic Places in Pennsylvania
Houses completed in 1863
Houses in Perry County, Pennsylvania
National Register of Historic Places in Perry County, Pennsylvania